Heinrich Seeling (1 October 1852 – 15 February 1932) was a German architect.

Life
He was born the son of a bricklayer in the Thuringian town of Zeulenroda, then part of the sovereign Principality of Reuss within the German Confederation. Seeling upon his apprenticeship received further academic training at the college for civil engineering in Holzminden in the Duchy of Brunswick and studied at the Prussian Bauakademie in Berlin, capital of the German Empire since 1871. 

After studies in Vienna and Italy, Seeling began his career working as an assistant in the studios of Hugo Licht, Hermann Ende and Wilhelm Böckmann in Berlin. In 1882/83 he unsuccessfully competed with Paul Wallot in an architectural contest to erect the new Reichstag building. Nevertheless he soon acquired renown as an architect of numerous lavish theatre buildings throughout Germany, starting with the construction of the Stadttheater Halle in 1886. He also designed two Protestant churches and several residential and commercial buildings in Bromberg in the Prussian Province of Posen, today Bydgoszcz in Poland.

In 1907 he was appointed director of the building authority in the then independent city of Charlottenburg (incorporated into Berlin in 1920), where he designed the Deutsches Opernhaus, as well as several municipal buildings together with his co-worker Richard Ermisch. Since 1896 Seeling was a member of the Prussian Academy of Arts.

Work

Many of Seeling's buildings were demolished by strategic bombing during World War II, some were rebuilt in a Modern style:
 1880 Rathaus Calau
 1886 Stadttheater Halle 
 1892 Theater am Schiffbauerdamm, Berlin 
 1892 Grillo-Theater, Essen 
 1895 Stadttheater Rostock
 1896 Theater Bromberg (from 1919 Teatr Miejski, Bydgoszcz, demolished in 1945)
 1897 Christuskirche, Bromberg (present-day Kościół Zbawiciela, Bydgoszcz)
 1901 Theater Aachen, conversion
 1902 Schauspielhaus Frankfurt
 1902 Theater Gera
 1903 Evangelische Kirche, Bromberg (present-day Kościół św. Andrzeja Boboli, Bydgoszcz)
 1905 Staatstheater Nürnberg, then the most expensive theatre construction in Europe
 1907 Kiel Opera House
 1910 Theater Freiburg
 1910 Rathaus Charlottenburg, extension
 1912 Deutsche Oper, Charlottenburg
 1914 Waldhaus Charlottenburg, Kremmen

External links

1852 births
1932 deaths
19th-century German architects
20th-century German architects
People from Greiz (district)